Nóvita is a municipality and town in the Chocó Department, Colombia.

It was the first capital of Chocó Province. It was a traditional center for gold mining, Many of its residents are Afro-Colombians.

In the 1850s, supplies, and possibly even people, were brought to the town by porters due to "the mountainous terrain, very high rainfall, and many rivers" of the surrounding region.

Climate
Nóvita has an extremely wet tropical rainforest climate (Af) with over 9000 mm of rain annually.

References 

Municipalities of Chocó Department